Hundemamachen (The Little Dog Mom) is a 1920 German silent comedy film directed by Rudolf Biebrach and starring Ossi Oswalda, Emil Biron and Ferry Sikla.

The film's sets were designed by the art director Jack Winter.

Cast
 Ossi Oswalda as Ossi 
 Emil Biron as Karl-Maria 
 Ferry Sikla as Mathias Brockmüller 
 Rudolf Biebrach as Kupferberg 
 Paula Erberty as Ossis Mutter 
 Friedrich Degner as Gerichtsvollzieher

References

Bibliography
 Bock, Hans-Michael & Bergfelder, Tim. The Concise CineGraph. Encyclopedia of German Cinema. Berghahn Books, 2009.

External links

1920 films
Films of the Weimar Republic
German silent feature films
German black-and-white films
1920 comedy films
German comedy films
Films directed by Rudolf Biebrach
UFA GmbH films
Silent comedy films
1920s German films
1920s German-language films